Gabriel Bordier (born 8 October 1997) is a French racewalker. He competed in the men's 20 kilometres walk at the 2019 World Athletics Championships held in Doha, Qatar. He finished in 24th place.

In 2016, he competed in the men's 10,000 metres walk at the 2016 IAAF World U20 Championships held in Bydgoszcz, Poland. He finished in 11th place.

In 2017, he won the bronze medal in the men's 20 kilometres walk at the European Athletics U23 Championships held in Bydgoszcz, Poland. In the same year, he also competed in the men's 20 kilometres walk at the 2017 Summer Universiade held in Taipei, Taiwan. He finished in 16th place.

In 2019, he also competed in the men's 20 kilometres walk at the European Athletics U23 Championships held in Gävle, Sweden. He did not finish his race.

References

External links 
 

Living people
1997 births
Place of birth missing (living people)
French male racewalkers
World Athletics Championships athletes for France
Competitors at the 2017 Summer Universiade
Athletes (track and field) at the 2020 Summer Olympics
Olympic athletes of France